The South Round Valley School, in Morgan County, Utah near Morgan, Utah, was built in 1873 by stonemason Henry Olpin.  It was listed on the National Register of Historic Places in 2011.

It is asserted to have elements of Classical architectural style.

It is a one-room schoolhouse.

It is located east of Morgan at 1925 E. Round Valley Rd. adjacent to, or on the grounds of, what is now the Round Valley Golf Course.

References

One-room schoolhouses in Utah
School buildings on the National Register of Historic Places in Utah
National Register of Historic Places in Morgan County, Utah
School buildings completed in 1873